John Stillman may refer to:

 Jack Wrangler (John Robert Stillman, 1946–2009), American pornographic film actor, theatrical producer, and director and writer
 John Stillman (judge) (1833–1883), American lawyer, businessman and teacher
 John Maxson Stillman (1852–1923), pioneer of the history of science in the United States
 John Stillman (architect), founded Stillman & Eastwick-Field Partnership
 John Stillman (Cold Case), a fictional character in the CBS crime drama Cold Case